Oshawa Centre is a two-storey shopping mall located in the city of Oshawa, Ontario, Canada. Located at King Street and Stevenson Road, it is the largest mall in Durham Region and the largest in Ontario east of Toronto with over 230 retail stores and public services. Its Executive Office complex includes the Ministry of Health of Ontario.

The Oshawa Centre is owned and managed by Ivanhoé Cambridge. One of Durham Region Transit's bus terminals is located outside of the mall's south-east entrance, from which there are regular bus services to Oshawa GO Station, Whitby GO Station, and the campuses of Durham College, among other destinations.

History
The shopping mall opened as a shopping plaza in 1956 and was enclosed in 1968.

Ivanhoé Cambridge had the grand opening of the  renovated and expanded a portion of the mall on September 29, 2016. The renovation and expansion project began in the summer of 2013 which included 60 additional stores within the mall. In 2014, Zellers was torn down to make room for what is now parking space. The former 1950s-themed food court was replaced with a new 1000-seat food court. The food court was relocated to the east section of the mall, in the new addition.

Former large retailers at Oshawa Centre included:

Zellers (closed and torn down due to renovation) and was originally supposed to be a new Target store, but never came to fruition.
Sears (closed in 2018 with the liquidation of Sears Canadian operations)—vacant.
Mark's Work Wearhouse (Moved across the street beside the Canadian Tire)
Eaton's (closed down in the mid-90s)
Famous Players (closed down when a new Cineplex theatre opened in North Oshawa)
 
The former Westmount Public School, a heritage building built in 1925, was acquired in 1988 and was demolished in September 2018 to make way for the mall's future expansion.

See also
List of largest enclosed shopping malls in Canada

References

External links

Buildings and structures in Oshawa
Ivanhoé Cambridge
Shopping malls established in 1956
Shopping malls in Ontario
Tourist attractions in the Regional Municipality of Durham
1956 establishments in Ontario